Pecheniki is a rural locality (a selo) in Starodubsky District, Bryansk Oblast, Russia. The population was 84 as of 2010. There are 5 streets.

Geography 
Pecheniki is located 6 km northeast of Starodub (the district's administrative centre) by road. Brodok is the nearest rural locality.

References 

Rural localities in Starodubsky District